Bernard Evans Ward RBSA RSA RA RBA (1857 – August 3, 1933) was a British painter who emigrated to the United States.

Life and creative work
 Born in London, Ward was a renowned painter of the Victorian era who won a gold medal for some of his works exhibited at the Royal Society of British Artists. In 1882 while still a student at the Royal Academy he won two silver medals.  Then Bernard E. Ward founded, together with A. A. Calderon (1847-1911), London´s St John's Wood Art School.
After a lawsuit had cost him his fortune, he emigrated to the United States, where he lived in 1913 near Cleveland, Ohio, where his daughter was a reporter for a London newspaper, possibly the Illustrated London News. Ward quickly made himself a name as a portraitist in his new hometown. In the early 1920s, the family lived for some time in Florida, before returning to Akron, Ohio, where Bernard Evans Ward died at the age of 76 in his granddaughter's house.

His works were exhibited at the Walker Art Gallery, Liverpool, at the Royal Birmingham Society of Artists, the Royal Scottish Academy, the Royal Academy of Arts and the Royal Society of British Artists.

Selected works
 London Flower Girls, Piccadilly Circus, 1895, oil on canvas
 Mother and Child, oil on canvas
 Richmond Castle, Yorkshire, watercolor 
 Escena rural, 1902

References

Sources 

R.R. Bowker Company, American Federation of Arts: American Art Directory, 1933.

Torchia, R. W.: Lost Colony: The Artists of St. Augustine, 1930-1950, Lightner Museum, Saint Augustine, Florida; October 2001. . URL last accessed September 10, 2008.
Wood, Christopher et al. (eds.): Dictionary of Victorian painters (Dictionary of British Artists, vol IV), Woodbridge, 1991.
An account from a member of the family. URL last accessed September 10, 2008.

Further reading 
Falk, Who's Who in American Art, 1985.
Johnson, Works exhibited at the Royal Society of British artists 1824-93 and at the New English Art Club 1888-1917, Woodbridge 1975.

1857 births
1933 deaths
19th-century British painters
British male painters
20th-century British painters
British emigrants to the United States
19th-century American painters
American male painters
20th-century American painters
20th-century American male artists
19th-century American male artists
19th-century British male artists
20th-century British male artists